Waxahatchee Creek is a  tributary of the lower Coosa River near Shelby, Alabama. It forms the southeastern border between Shelby County and Chilton County, where it is crossed by Alabama State Route 145. The lower reaches of Waxahatchee Creek are broad and popular with water skiers and recreational boaters. Several resort camps and marinas are located on the creek, and anglers have found the submerged forests of the middle to upper creek are favorite spots for largemouth bass. The channel is known for crappie. In the upper creek, the water grows very shallow, but there are "holes" of deep water where bluegill and bream are plentiful.

Waxahatchee Creek is part of the habitat of the threatened round rocksnail, which is included on the United States Fish and Wildlife Service list of endangered species.

References in popular culture
Waxahatchee, name of American indie rock music project of singer-songwriter Katie Crutchfield

See also 

 List of place names of Native American origin in Alabama
 Waxahachie, a city in Texas with a name possibly derived from Waxahatchee Creek

References

External links
Big bass hopes for one of Alabama's best

Rivers of Alabama
Rivers of Shelby County, Alabama
Rivers of Chilton County, Alabama
Alabama placenames of Native American origin